Kentucky Academy of Science (KAS) is the Kentucky affiliate of the American Association for the Advancement of Science and the National Association of Academies of Science. The organization "fosters scientific discovery and understanding in Kentucky". It is a statewide scientific society serving scientists and science advocates. Projects include various outreach initiatives to advance science literacy in Kentucky and policy advocacy around scientific and educational issues. The KAS has passed resolutions in favor of evolution in 1981, 1983, 1999, and 2005, and have stood up against a series of legislative efforts in Kentucky to undermine science education

History
Kentucky Academy of Science was organized on May 8, 1914 by a group of 46 Kentucky scientists and interested laypersons.

Current activities
The Kentucky Academy of Science, with more than 4000 members, "fosters scientific discovery and understanding in Kentucky." KAS provides funds for scientific research and outreach through grants including the Marcia Athey and Botany Funds, Special Research Program, and Undergraduate Research Program.

The Journal of the Kentucky Academy of Science, the academy's official journal, is published in the Spring and Fall each year.

KAS sponsors the Kentucky Junior Academy of Science each April, for middle and high school students engaged in research. Students with winning presentations are eligible to represent Kentucky as delegates at the American Junior Academy of Science meeting the following February.

KAS' Annual Meeting each fall convenes hundreds of scientists and students from around the state and region to present their latest research.

KAS operates the Kentucky Science Speakers Bureau, offering expert scientists at no cost to civic organizations, educators, or others, to share their knowledge on a variety of issues.

KAS is also active in promoting science literacy through a partnership with the Kentucky Science Center, and does state-level policy advocacy around science and education.

During the 2005 KAS annual meeting, members voted unanimously to oppose any attempt by the Kentucky legislature or other legislative bodies to mandate specific content of science courses. The KAS specifically objects to legislation that equates "scientific creationism" or "intelligent design" with evolution as a scientific explanation. The KAS has passed resolutions in favor of evolution in 1981, 1983, 1999, and 2005.

References

External links
Kentucky Academy of Science Home Page
Guide to Kentucky Academy of Science Records, 1892-1953 housed at the University of Kentucky Libraries Special Collections Research Center
Kentucky Junior Academy of Science
Kentucky Science Speakers Bureau
Journal of the Kentucky Academy of Science

Education in Kentucky
Academies of sciences
Science and technology in the United States
Science and technology in Kentucky
1914 establishments in Kentucky
Scientific organizations established in 1914